Red hands, also known as hot hands, slapsies, slap jack, red tomato (Northern Britain), Pope slap, tennis, slaps, chicken, slappy-patties, or simply the hand slap game, is a children's game which can be played by two players.

One player extends their hands forward, roughly at arm's length, with the palms down. The other player's hands, also roughly at arm's length, are placed, palms up, under the first player's hands. The object of the game is for the second player to slap the back of the first player's hands before the first player can pull them away. If the slapping player misses, the players swap roles and play again.

The slapper is on offense and must act with sufficient speed, because the slappee's goal is to pull their hands away, and out of the area where the hands overlap, to avoid the slap. The slapper can only slap the hand it is underneath.

The slappee is on defense and attempts to avoid having their hands slapped, by pulling their hands away as the slapper brings their hands over to attempt a slap. However, the slappee cannot flinch too much in attempting to avoid a slap: in one variation of the game, if the slappee pulls their hands away when the slapper has not brought their hands around a designated number of times in a row (normally three), then the slappee must submit to a "free slap" by the slapper. Also, the slapper must use both hands to slap the slappee. If they do one hand, a “free slap” will be awarded.

Variations

Another variation is where the slappee has their hands held palms together, held out at mid-torso height; the slapper then does the same with the tips of the fingers of both players hands around a centimetre apart, or with the tips of the middle fingers touching, and then (with just one of their hands) the slapper tries to slap the backs of the slappee's hands. You can slap the slappee's hands with just one of your hands as a strategical move.

Another variation is play as above but with one (or both) player(s) blindfolded.  If both players are blindfolded, you will need someone else to make sure they start in the right positions.

See also
Bloody knuckles
Mercy
Red hand
Slapjack

References

Hand games
Children's games
Endurance games